Daishawn Orpheo Marvin Redan (born 2 February 2001) is a Dutch professional footballer who plays as a forward for Italian  club Venezia.

Career

Redan made his professional debut for Hertha BSC in the Bundesliga on 25 August 2019, coming on as a substitute for Salomon Kalou in the 70th minute of the home match against VfL Wolfsburg, which finished as a 0–3 loss.

In the January 2020 transfer window, he was loaned to Dutch Eredivisie side FC Groningen for 6 months.

On 31 August 2021, he was loaned for the season by PEC Zwolle.

On 27 June 2022, Redan extended his contract with Hertha BSC and then joined Utrecht on a season-long loan deal with an option to buy.

On 31 January 2023, Redan signed a three-and-a-half-year contract with Venezia in Italy.

Personal life
Redan was born in Amsterdam, and is of Surinamese descent.

Career statistics

Honours
Netherlands U17
 UEFA European Under-17 Championship: 2018

Individual
Eredivisie Talent of the Month: February 2022

References

External links
 
 
 

2001 births
Dutch sportspeople of Surinamese descent
Footballers from Amsterdam
Living people
Dutch footballers
Netherlands youth international footballers
Netherlands under-21 international footballers
Association football forwards
Hertha BSC players
Hertha BSC II players
FC Groningen players
PEC Zwolle players
FC Utrecht players
Jong FC Utrecht players
Venezia F.C. players
Bundesliga players
Regionalliga players
Eredivisie players
Eerste Divisie players
Dutch expatriate footballers
Dutch expatriate sportspeople in England
Expatriate footballers in England
Dutch expatriate sportspeople in Germany
Expatriate footballers in Germany
Dutch expatriate sportspeople in Italy
Expatriate footballers in Italy